Alexander Lauterwasser (born 1951 in Überlingen) is a German researcher and photographer who based his work on work done by Ernst Chladni and  Hans Jenny in the field of Cymatics.

In 2002, Lauterwasser published his book Wasser Klang Bilder (Water Sound Images) with imagery of water surfaces set into motion by sound sources ranging from pure sine waves to music by Ludwig van Beethoven, Karlheinz Stockhausen and even overtone chanting.

In 2006, MACROmedia Publishing published the English version of the Lauterwasser book titled Water Sound Images. It is a 176-page hardcover edition with hundreds of color photos, presenting the art, science and mystical side of Cymatics.

In 2012, Lauterwasser's work was featured in the film Inner Worlds Outer Worlds.

External links
Alexander Lauterwasser main website Wasser Klang Bilder
Cymatic Source - where images from the book "Water Sound Images" can be found
Wasser-Symposium Fotogalerie
Wasser-Symposium Fotogalerie

References

Photographers from Baden-Württemberg
1951 births
Living people
People from Überlingen